Mohamed Mohamed is the name of:

Politics 
 Mohamed Abdi Mohamed or Mohamed Gandhi, Somali geologist, anthropologist, historian and politician
 Mohamed Abdoulkader Mohamed (born 1951), Djiboutian FRUD politician
 Mohamed Abdullahi Mohamed (born 1962), President of Somalia
 Mohamed Ali Mohamed (born 1952), Djiboutian PDP politician
 Mohamed Ali Ould Sidi Mohamed, Mauritanian politician
 Mohamed Haniffa Mohamed (1921–2016), Sri Lankan politician

Sports 
 Mohamed Abdel Mohamed (born 1968), Egyptian handball player
 Mohamed Ben Mohamed (born 1938), Moroccan Olympic cyclist
 Mohamed Daud Mohamed (born 1996), Somali long-distance runner
 Mohamed Hassan Mohamed (born 1993), Somali middle-distance runner
 Mohamed Hassan A Mohamed or Mizo Amin (born 1991), Qatari basketball player
 Mohamed Samir Mohamed (born 1971), Egyptian Olympic hockey player
 Mohamed Mohamed (handballer), Bahraini handball player
 Mohamed Mohamed (footballer) (born 2002), Kenyan association football player

Others 
 Mohamed Azmi Mohamed, the former Lord President of the Federal Court of Malaysia
 Mohamed Elhassan Mohamed (born 1961), Sudanese entrepreneur in the United States
 Mohamed Latiff Mohamed (born 1950), Singaporean Malay poet and writer
 Mohamed Mohamed Atalla (1924–2009), Egyptian-American engineer, physical chemist, cryptographer, inventor and entrepreneur
 Mohamed Mohamed, housemate on Big Brother (British series 9)

See also 
 Muhammad (name)